During the 1994–95 English football season, Derby County F.C. competed in the Football League First Division.

Season summary
During the 1994–95 season, several players left Derby, including Kitson joining Newcastle United for £2.25m, Charles and Johnson moving to Aston Villa for a combined £2.9m and Pembridge moving to Sheffield Wednesday. The side was also weakened when goalkeeper Martin Taylor, an ever-present the previous season and touted for a place in the England squad, broke his leg in a 1–0 defeat at Southend United and was out of action for the next 29 months. With chairman Lionel Pickering's increased frustration at no return on his investment, the purse strings were tightened and McFarland was unable to buy suitable replacements, instead blooding youth products such as Dean Sturridge, Russell Hoult and Lee Carsley to fill the gaps created by the departures. In the event Derby could only record a 9th-place finish and McFarland, in the knowledge his contract was not going to be renewed, said his goodbye's in the penultimate match of the season, a 2–1 home defeat at Southend United, ending a  28-year association with the club, broken only by a two-year spell as player-manager at Bradford City.

Final league table

Results
Derby County's score comes first

Legend

Football League First Division

FA Cup

League Cup

Anglo-Italian Cup

Players

First-team squad
The following players all appeared for the first team this season.

Reserve team
The following players did not appear for the first team this season.

References

Notes

Derby County F.C. seasons
Derby County